The men's 500 meter at the 2023 KNSB Dutch Single Distance Championships took place in Heerenveen at the Thialf ice skating rink on Friday 3 February 2023. There were 20 participants who raced twice over 500m so that all skaters had to start once in the inner lane and once in the outer lane. Merijn Scheperkamp, Hein Otterspeer, and Dai Dai N'tab qualified for the 2023 ISU World Speed Skating Championships in Heerenveen.

Statistics

Result

·	DNS = Did not start
·	NC = No classification

Draw 1st. 500 meter

Draw 2nd. 500 meter

 Referee: Bert Timmerman.  Assistant: Frank Spoel.  Starter: Janny Smegen 

Source:

References

External links
 KNSB

Dutch Single Distance Championships
Single Distance Championships
2023 Single Distance
KNSB Dutch Single Distance Championships, 2023
KNSB